Bąków may refer to the following places in Poland:
Bąków, Oleśnica County in Lower Silesian Voivodeship (south-west Poland)
Bąków, Wrocław County in Lower Silesian Voivodeship (south-west Poland)
Bąków, Silesian Voivodeship (south Poland)
Bąków, Subcarpathian Voivodeship (south-east Poland)
Bąków, Przysucha County in Masovian Voivodeship (east-central Poland)
Bąków, Szydłowiec County in Masovian Voivodeship (east-central Poland)
Bąków, Brzeg County in Opole Voivodeship (south-west Poland)
Bąków, Kluczbork County in Opole Voivodeship (south-west Poland)